Alexandra Clair Lee is an Australian comedian, writer, actor, and television presenter. She has appeared in a range of comedy television series on the ABC and SBS, including The Feed and several programs by The Chaser team. She is also the host of the ABC quiz show Win the Week, starring alongside Craig Reucassel.

Early life
Lee was born to an Australian mother and a Chinese father, who met in Sydney in 1975. She grew up in Southern Sydney, and studied journalism at the University of Sydney.

Career
Lee began her career in journalism, as a producer for ABC News 24. She took part in the Walkley Foundation's Australia-Korea Media Exchange Program, and later became a political reporter for BuzzFeed. Having performed in comedy shows at university, she became a presenter and writer for the ABC's satirical news program The Roast in 2014.

Having collaborated with The Chaser on The Roast, Lee went on to appear in The Chaser's Media Circus, The Checkout, and The Chaser’s Election Desk. In 2017, Lee starred in Michelle Law's play Single Asian Female. Since 2018, Lee has also been featured as a presenter and comedy actor on The Feed. A segment she presented about retiring radio shock-jock Alan Jones prompted a lawsuit from Jones in 2020.

Lee was a writer and cast member for Rove McManus' short-lived variety show Saturday Night Rove in 2019. In 2021, Lee was announced as the host for Win the Week, appearing alongside Craig Reucassel in a new quiz show airing on the ABC.

Lee is also a regular player on Dragon Friends, a Dungeons & Dragons-themed podcast and live show.

Personal life
Lee has a husband, and she gave birth to a son in 2019.

References

External links

Australian game show hosts
Australian people of Chinese descent
Australian women comedians
Living people
Year of birth missing (living people)